Roosevelt County is a county located in the U.S. state of New Mexico. As of the 2010 census, the population was 19,846. Its county seat is Portales. The county was created in 1903 from Chaves and Guadalupe counties and named for the then-current President of the United States, Theodore Roosevelt. The county's eastern border is the Texas state line.

Roosevelt County comprises the Portales, NM Micropolitan Statistical Area, which is also included in the Clovis–Portales, NM Combined Statistical Area.

Geography

Adjacent counties
 Curry County - north
 Quay County - north
 De Baca County - west
 Chaves County - west
 Lea County - south
 Cochran County, Texas - southeast
 Bailey County, Texas - east

National protected area
 Grulla National Wildlife Refuge (part)

Demographics

2000 census
As of the 2000 census, there were 18,018 people, 6,639 households, and 4,541 families living in the county. The racial makeup of the county was 74.14% White, 1.65% Black or African American, 1.10% Native American, 0.62% Asian, 0.07% Pacific Islander, 19.76% from other races, and 2.65% from two or more races. 33.29% of the population were Hispanic or Latino of any race.

There were 6,639 households, out of which 35.50% had children under the age of 18 living with them, 53.00% were married couples living together, 11.70% had a female householder with no husband present, and 31.60% were non-families. 24.70% of all households were made up of individuals, and 9.10% had someone living alone who was 65 years of age or older. The average household size was 2.60 and the average family size was 3.14.

In the county, the population was spread out, with 28.10% under the age of 18, 16.00% from 18 to 24, 25.50% from 25 to 44, 18.30% from 45 to 64, and 12.10% who were 65 years of age or older. The median age was 30 years. For every 100 females there were 96.50 males. For every 100 females age 18 and over, there were 93.50 males.

The median income for a household in the county was $26,586, and the median income for a family was $31,813. Males had a median income of $26,170 versus $20,684 for females. The per capita income for the county was $14,185. About 17.30% of families and 22.70% of the population were below the poverty line, including 25.10% of those under age 18 and 16.80% of those age 65 or over.

2010 census
As of the 2010 census, there were 19,846 people, 7,299 households, and 4,671 families living in the county. The racial makeup of the county was 76.9% white, 1.8% black or African American, 1.3% American Indian, 0.9% Asian, 15.9% from other races, and 3.2% from two or more races. Those of Hispanic or Latino origin made up 39.9% of the population. In terms of ancestry, 12.7% were German, 10.0% were American, 9.8% were English, and 9.3% were Irish.

Of the 7,299 households, 35.6% had children under the age of 18 living with them, 47.3% were married couples living together, 11.7% had a female householder with no husband present, 36.0% were non-families, and 28.3% of all households were made up of individuals. The average household size was 2.57 and the average family size was 3.20. The median age was 29.7 years.

The median income for a household in the county was $37,762 and the median income for a family was $43,536. Males had a median income of $37,719 versus $21,916 for females. The per capita income for the county was $16,933. About 16.0% of families and 22.8% of the population were below the poverty line, including 25.6% of those under age 18 and 14.3% of those age 65 or over.

Government and politics
The Roosevelt County clerk and deputy clerk resigned in late 2013 after the New Mexico Supreme Court ruled that all counties in the state must license same-sex marriages. County Manager Bill Cathey said they had resolved to quit "rather than be associated with that," according to the Associated Press.

Roosevelt County is heavily Republican. It has not voted for a Democratic presidential candidate since Lyndon B. Johnson in 1964.

Communities

City
 Portales (county seat)

Town
 Elida

Villages
 Causey
 Dora
 Floyd

Unincorporated communities
 Cameo
 Kenna
 Milnesand
 Pep
 Rogers

Education
School districts include:
 Dora Consolidated Schools
 Elida Municipal Schools
 Floyd Municipal Schools
 House Municipal Schools
 Melrose Public Schools
 Portales Municipal Schools
 Texico Municipal Schools

See also
 National Register of Historic Places listings in Roosevelt County, New Mexico

References

External links
 Roosevelt County information on High Plains Historical Foundation
 Roosevelt County Official Website
 A resource for the Clovis/ Portales/ Curry/ Roosevelt and Cannon Air Force Base Community

 
1903 establishments in New Mexico Territory